Blazing Lamp is one of the Seventeen tantras of Dzogchen Upadesha.

Primary resources
gser gyi me tog mdzes pa rin po che sgron ma 'bar ba'i rgyud @ Wikisource in Wylie
གསེར་གྱི་མེ་ཏོག་མཛེས་པ་རིན་པོ་ཆེ་སྒྲོན་མ་འབར་བའི་རྒྱུད @ Wikisource in Uchen (Tibetan Script), Unicode

Notes

Sources
 Hatchell, Patrick (2014): Naked Seeing - The Great Perfection, the Wheel of Time, and Visionary Buddhism in Renaissance Tibet. Oxford University Press. New York. .

Dzogchen texts
Nyingma tantras